Backpacking Light is an online hiking magazine founded in 2001 by hiker Ryan Jordan. The print version was discontinued in October 2008. The Sierra Club has named it a major player in the ultralight backpacking subculture. Articles are written by scientists, engineers, and experienced hikers. Backpacking Light has developed outdoor leadership training programs and workshops for a variety of groups and organizations including the Boy Scouts of America, search and rescue teams, and the National Outdoor Leadership School.

References

2001 establishments in Montana
Magazines established in 2001
Magazines published in Montana
Online magazines published in the United States
Sports magazines published in the United States